The Adventures of Gerard is a 1970 British-Italian-Swiss adventure comedy film directed by Jerzy Skolimowski and starring Peter McEnery, Claudia Cardinale, Eli Wallach and Jack Hawkins. It was based on the 1896 collection The Exploits of Brigadier Gerard by Arthur Conan Doyle.

Premise
Vain, egotistical Etienne Gerard, a French brigadier, serves during the Napoleonic Wars. He thinks he is the best soldier and lover that ever lived and intends to prove it.

Cast
 Peter McEnery as Colonel Gerard
 Claudia Cardinale as Theresa
 Eli Wallach as Napoleon I
 Jack Hawkins as Millefleurs 
 Mark Burns as Colonel Russell
 Norman Rossington as Sergeant Papilette
 John Neville as  Wellington
 Paolo Stoppa as Santarem, Count of Morales
 Ivan Desny as Gen. Lassalle
 Leopoldo Trieste as Marshal Massena 
 Solvi Stubing

See also
 Brigadier Gerard (1915)
 The Fighting Eagle (1927)

References

External links

1970 films
1970s adventure comedy films
1970s English-language films
British adventure comedy films
Films based on works by Arthur Conan Doyle
Films directed by Jerzy Skolimowski
Films with screenplays by Jerzy Skolimowski
Napoleonic Wars films
United Artists films
Films based on British novels
Depictions of Napoleon on film
Cultural depictions of Arthur Wellesley, 1st Duke of Wellington
1970s historical adventure films
British historical adventure films
1970s historical comedy films
British historical comedy films
1970s British films